Kumakh is a rural municipality located in Salyan District of Karnali Province of Nepal.

{
  "type": "FeatureCollection",
  "features": [
    {
      "type": "Feature",
      "properties": {},
      "geometry": {
        "type": "Point",
        "coordinates": [
          82.18528747558592,
          28.43578917275445
        ]
      }
    }
  ]
}

Demographics
At the time of the 2011 Nepal census, Kumakh Rural Municipality had a population of 24,988. Of these, 100.0% spoke Nepali as their first language.

In terms of ethnicity/caste, 60.7% were Chhetri, 12.9% Kami, 6.8% Magar, 6.8% Thakuri, 4.1% Hill Brahmin, 3.3% Sanyasi/Dasnami, 2.5% Damai/Dholi, 0.9% Sarki, 0.9% Badi and 1.1% others.

In terms of religion, 99.2% were Hindu and 0.8% Christian.

References

External links
 Official website

Populated places in Salyan District, Nepal
Rural municipalities in Karnali Province
Rural municipalities of Nepal established in 2017